Salamandrella  is a genus of salamanders in the family Hynobiidae.

It contains these species:
Salamandrella keyserlingii Dybowski, 1870
Salamandrella tridactyla Nikolskii, 1905

References

 
Amphibian genera
Taxa named by Benedykt Dybowski